The 1961 French Championships (now known as the French Open) was a tennis tournament that took place on the outdoor clay courts at the Stade Roland-Garros in Paris, France. The tournament ran from 15 May until 28 May. It was the 65th staging of the French Championships, and the second Grand Slam tennis event of 1961. Manuel Santana and Ann Haydon won the singles titles.

Finals

Men's singles

 Manuel Santana defeated  Nicola Pietrangeli 4–6, 6–1, 3–6, 6–0, 6–2

Women's singles

 Ann Haydon defeated  Yola Ramírez 6–2, 6–1

Men's doubles

 Roy Emerson /   Rod Laver defeated  Bob Howe /  Bob Mark  3–6, 6–1, 6–1, 6–4

Women's doubles

 Sandra Reynolds /  Renee Schuurman defeated  Maria Bueno / Darlene Hard walkover

Mixed doubles

 Darlene Hard /  Rod Laver defeated  Vera Suková /  Jirí Javorský  6–0, 2–6, 6–3

References

External links
 French Open official website

French Championships
French Championships (tennis) by year
French Championships (tennis)
French Championships (tennis)
French Championships (tennis)